MX IGP may refer to:

GeForce2 MX IGP
GeForce4 MX IGP